Síkat F.C. is a women's semi-professional football club based in the Philippines. The team has participated at the PFF Women's Cup, the national cup for women's football in the Philippines. It was formerly known as Smüch F.C.

References

External links
 Official club Facebook website

Women's football clubs in the Philippines
2010 establishments in the Philippines